Efe Grace is a Ghanaian singer and songwriter. She is a gospel musician. Efe Grace was nominated for the Gospel Artist of the Year award during the 2021 Vodafone Ghana Music Awards.

Early life and education 
Efe Grace hails from Agogo in the Ashanti Region, Ghana. Grace is the daughter of Ghanaian gospel minister, Rev. Mensah Bonsu. She is the eldest of three children. She attended Yaa Asantewaa Girls School and completed in 2006. She furthered her education at Christian Service University College graduating in 2011 with a Bachelor of Business Administration in Banking and Finance.

Music career 
Grace started singing whilst she was teenager, joining serving as a backing vocalist for her father. She eventually became a worship leader in her church whilst also serving as a jazz musician at hotels, restaurants and pubs in Kumasi. She also served as a backing vocalist for Becca and Kwabena Kwabena.

Grace started out as a backing vocalist for Sonnie Badu and Ohemaa Mercy. She released her debut single in October 2018 titled "Yehowa ne M'abankese" which was a refix of her father's song with the same title. She released another single King of Glory. In 2020, she earned her first Vodafone Ghana Music Award nomination for the female Vocalist award category.

Efe Grace was also nominated for the Emerging Woman of the Year and Best Female Vocal Performance for the 2021 3Music Awards.

She gained two nominations for the Gospel Artist of the Year and Best Female Vocal Performance of the Year for her song Lord Have your way at the 2021 Vodafone Ghana Music Awards. The Female Vocal Performance award was subsequently won by Abiana. In September 2021, she released her fourth and firth singles titled Overflow and Sounds of Heaven.

In 2022, Efe Grace again earned three nominations for Gospel Act of the Year, Best Female Vocal Performance for her song Overflow and Performer of the Year for her performance at 2021 3Music Women's Brunch Performance.

Notable performances 
Since starting her solo career, she has performed at the Ghana Music Awards where she performed with Ohemaa Mercy and Joe Mettle. Hope Concert and Ignite Virtual Concert. She also performed at the 2021 3Music Women's Brunch.

Discography

Singles 

 Yehowa ne M'abankese (2019)
 King of Glory (2019)
 Lord Have your way (2020)
 Overflow (2021)
 Sound of Heaven (2021)

Awards and nominations

References

External links 

 Official website

Living people
People from Agogo, Ghana
Ghanaian Christians
21st-century Ghanaian women singers
Ghanaian gospel singers
Yaa Asantewaa Girls' Senior High School alumni
Year of birth missing (living people)